Luang Prabang railway station is a railway station in Luang Prabang, Laos. It is the 9th station on the Boten–Vientiane railway. The main building was completed on 3 December 2020 and the station was opened along with the rest of the line on 3 December 2021.

Gallery

References 

Railway stations in Laos
Railway stations opened in 2021